The 1944 Svenska Cupen final took place on 1 October 1944 at Råsunda in Solna. It was contested between Allsvenskan sides IFK Norrköping and Malmö FF. IFK Norrköping played their second consecutive final and their second final in total, Malmö FF played their first cup final ever. Malmö FF won their first title with a 4–3 victory after extra time. 35,087 spectators attended the match which remains the record for the Svenska Cupen Final.

Match details

External links
Svenska Cupen at svenskfotboll.se

1944
Cup
Malmö FF matches
IFK Norrköping matches
Football in Stockholm
October 1944 sports events